This is a List of Australian rules football families, that is families who have had more than one member play or coach in the Australian Football League (previously the VFL) as well as families who have had multiple immediate family members with notable playing or coaching careers in the West Australian Football League (WAFL), South Australian National Football League (SANFL) or Victorian Football League (VFL, formerly known as the VFA). Each family will have at least a father and child combination or a set of siblings. Many families have had two or more cousins play league football but they are not included unless one also had a father, child or sibling play.

Families with members playing or coaching in the AFL Women's competition, which launched in 2017, are also included.

A

Abbey 
Angus Abbey
Son: Ross Abbey
Angus is Ross's father.

Abbott 
Clarence Abbott
Les Abbott
Clarrie and Les were brothers.

Abernethy 
Bob Abernethy
Jim Abernethy
Bob and Jim were brothers.

Ablett 

Len Ablett
Cousin once removed: Geoff Ablett (/)
Cousin once removed: Kevin Ablett (/)
Son: Luke Ablett
Cousin once removed: Gary Ablett Sr. (/)
Son: Gary Ablett Jr.
Son: Nathan Ablett

Gary is the brother of Geoff and Kevin and father of Gary Jr. and Nathan, Kevin is Luke's father. Len Ablett is the cousin of Gary Ablett's father. Gary Junior and Nathan are cousins of Shane Tuck (Hawthorn rookie list 2000, Richmond 2004–2009) and Travis Tuck (Hawthorn 2007–2009), who are the sons of the league's former games record holder, Michael Tuck. Two further members of the family, Michael and Ryan, were both rookie listed at AFL clubs and have competed in the VFL.

Adamson 
Jack Adamson
Dave Adamson
Jack was the elder brother of Dave.

Ah Chee 
Brendon Ah Chee
Callum Ah Chee
Brendon is the elder brother of Callum.

Ahmat
 Matthew Ahmat
 Robert Ahmat
Matthew and Robert are brothers.

Aish
 Peter Aish (Norwood)
 Michael Aish (Norwood)
 Andrew Aish (Norwood)
 Son: James Aish
Andrew and Michael are brothers. Andrew is James's father.

Aitchison
 Ern Aitchison
 Jack Aitchison
Ern and Jack were brothers.

Aked/Edwards/O'Bree 
Frank Aked Sr.
Son: Frank Aked Jr.
Son-in-law: Arthur Edwards
Son: Allan Edwards
Son: Jake Edwards
Nephew: Shane O'Bree

Arthur is the father of Allan, who is the father of Jake and the uncle of Shane.  Arthur married the daughter of Frank Aked Sr.
Frank Sr. is Frank Jr.'s father.  Arthur Edwards married Frank Jr.'s sister, making Frank Sr. the grandfather of Allan Edwards and the great-grandfather of Jake Edwards and Shane O'Bree.

Albiston 
Harold Albiston
Son: David Albiston
Alec Albiston
Ken Albiston
Alec, Harold and Ken were brothers. Harold is the father of David.

Allan (1) 
Graeme Allan
 Son: Marcus Allan
Graeme is the father of Marcus.

Allan (2)
 Ron Allan
 Son: Barry Allan
Ron is Barry's father.

Allan (3)
 Keith Allan (Central District)
 Daughter: Jessica Allan
 Daughter: Sarah Allan
Keith is the father of Sarah and Jessica.

Allen
 George Allen
 Tommy Allen
George and Tommy were brothers.

Allison
 Tom Allison
 Son: Brett Allison
Tom is Brett's father.

Alves
 Mark Alves
 Stan Alves
Mark and Stan are brothers.

Anderson (1)
Syd Anderson Sr. (Port Melbourne)
 Syd Anderson
 Claude Anderson
 Son: Graeme R. Anderson
 Son: Syd Anderson
Syd Sr. (played for Port Melbourne in the VFA) was the father of Syd (born 1918) and Claude, who was the father of Graeme and Syd (born 1949).

Anderson (2)
 Frank Anderson
 Son: Graeme F. Anderson
Frank was the father of Graeme.

Anderson (3)
Jed Anderson
Joe Anderson
Jed and Joe are brothers

Anderson (4)
Bernie Anderson
Noel Anderson
Bernie and Noel were brothers.

Anderson/Brown
 Doug Anderson
 Grandson: Fraser Brown
Doug Anderson was the grandfather of Fraser Brown.

Angus 
 George Angus
 Son: Les Angus
 Son: Geoff Angus
George was the father of Les. Les was the father of Geoff.

Angwin 
 Andy Angwin
 Grandson: Laurence Angwin
Andy was the grandfather of Laurence.

Antonio 
 Ebony Antonio
 Kara Antonio 
Ebony and Kara are married.

Armstrong 
Bert Armstrong
Lou Armstrong
Lou was the elder brother of Bert.

Arthur 
 Harold Arthur
 Alan Arthur
 Son: Graham Arthur
Alan is the father of Graham and brother of Harold.

Atkins (1) 
 Ernie Atkins
 Son: Jack Atkins
Ernie is the father of Jack.

Atkins (2) 
 Paul Atkins
 Simon Atkins
Paul and Simon are twins.

Atkinson (1)
 Art Atkinson
 Bill Atkinson
Art and Bill were brothers.

Atkinson (2)
 Bob Atkinson
 Ted Atkinson
 Son: John Atkinson
Bob and Ted were brothers. John is Ted's son.

Atley 
Shaun Atley
Joe Atley
Shaun is the elder brother of Joe.

Aubrey
 Bob Aubrey
 Son: Graeme Aubrey
Bob is the father of Graeme.

Austen 
Bob Austen
Col Austen
Cecil Austen
 Son: Geoff Austen
Cecil is the brother of Bob and Col, and the father of Geoff.

B

Baggott 
Jack Baggott
Ron Baggott
Jack and Ron were brothers.

Bagshaw
 Hartley Bagshaw (Sturt)
 John Bagshaw (Sturt)
 Paul Bagshaw (Sturt)
 Guy Bagshaw (Sturt)

Hartley was John and Paul's father. Guy is Paul's son and Hartley's grandson.

Bailes 
Barclay Bailes
Ernie Bailes
Barclay and Ernie were brothers.

Bairstow 
Mark Bairstow
 Son: Toby Bairstow
 Son: Dylan Bairstow
Mark is the father of Toby and Dylan, who have all played for South Fremantle.

Baker 
Reg Baker
Selwyn Baker
Ted Baker
Reg, Selwyn and Ted were brothers

Ball 
Ray Ball
 Son: Luke Ball
 Son: Matthew Ball
Luke and Matthew are the sons of Ray and the grandsons of Felix Russo.

Balme 
Craig Balme
Neil Balme
Craig and Neil are brothers.

Banks
Albert Banks
Tom Banks
Albert and Tom were brothers

Bant
Chris Bant
Horrie Bant
Chris and Horrie were brothers.

Barassi 
Ron Barassi Sr.
 Son: Ron Barassi
Ron Barassi is the son of Ron Barassi Senior.

Barham 
 Billy Barham
 Jamie Barham
 Ricky Barham
 Son: Jaxson Barham
Billy, Jamie and Ricky are brothers. Ricky is the father of Jaxson.

Barker (1)
 George Barker
 Syd Barker Sr.
 Son: Syd Barker Jr.
Syd Senior was the brother of George and the father of Syd Junior.

Barker (2)
 George Barker
 Jack Barker
George and Jack were brothers.

Barlow
 Kris Barlow
 Paul Barlow
Kris and Paul are brothers.

Barnes (1)
 Bert Barnes
 Son: Reg Barnes
Bert was the father of Reg.

Barnes (2)
 Jack Barnes
 Son: Ken Barnes
Jack was the father of Ken.

Barrot
 Bill Barrot
 Wes Barrot
Bill and Wes were brothers.

Barton
 Bill Barton
 Colin Barton
 George Barton
Bill, Colin and George were brothers.

Bassett 
Nathan Bassett
Scott Bassett
Nathan is the elder brother of Scott.

Batchelor
 Vin Batchelor
 Son: Keith Batchelor
Vin was the father of Keith.

Batty
 Ern Batty
 Les Batty
Ern and Les were brothers.

Baxter (1)
 Ben Baxter
 Son: Ray Baxter
Ben was the father of Ray.

Baxter (2)
 Ray Baxter
 Son: Darren Baxter
Ray is the father of Darren.

Baxter (3)
 Bernie Baxter
 Bill Baxter
 Ken Baxter
Bernie, Bill and Ken were brothers.

Bayes
 Gavin Bayes
 Mark Bayes
Gavin and Mark are brothers.

Beams
 Claye Beams
 Dayne Beams
Claye and Dayne are brothers.

Beasy
 Maurie Beasy
 Son: Doug Beasy
 Grandson: Brendan Whitecross
Maurie was the father of Doug, and the great-grandfather of Brendan.

Beckwith 
Wally Beckwith (umpire)
 Son: John Beckwith
Wally was the father of John.

Bedford
 Bill Bedford
 Son: Peter Bedford
Bill was the father of Peter.

Beers
 Brian Beers
 Son: Mark Beers
 Son: Tony Beers
Brian is the father of Mark and Tony.

Belcher 
Allan Belcher
Vic Belcher
Alan and Vic were brothers.

Bell
Dennis Bell
John Bell
Dennis and John were brothers.

Bendle
Alby Bendle
Bill Bendle
Alby and Bill were brothers.

Bentley
 Percy Bentley
 Bruce Bentley
Percy was the father of Bruce.

Berry
Jarrod Berry (Brisbane)

Thomas Berry (Brisbane,Gold Coast)

Jarrod and Thomas are brothers

Besanko
 Barry Besanko
 Neil Besanko
Barry and Neil are brothers.

Beveridge 
Jack Beveridge
 Grandson: Luke Beveridge
Jack was the grandfather of Luke.

Bewick
Darren Bewick
Corey Bewick
 Son: Rohan Bewick
 Son: Shaun Bewick
Darren and Corey are brothers, Rohan and Shaun are Corey's identical twin sons.  All have played for West Perth in the WAFL, Darren and Rohan have played in the AFL.

Bews
 Andrew Bews
 Son Jed Bews
Jed is the son of Andrew

Bickford
 Albert Bickford
 Edric Bickford
 Son: George Bickford
 Son: Stephen Bickford
 Brother-in-law: Rod McGregor

Albert and Edric were brothers. Rod was married to their sister. Edric was the father of George, who is the father of Stephen.

Blackwell 
Wayne Blackwell
 Son: Luke Blackwell
Wayne is the father of Luke.

Blake (1) 
Rod Blake
 Son: Mark Blake
Rod is the father of Mark.

Blake (2) 
George Blake
Mick Blake
Tom Blake
Tom, George and Mick were all brothers.

Board
 Terry J. Board
 Son: Terry M. Board
Terry J. is the father of Terry M.

Boland
 Brian Boland
 Son: Glenn Boland
Brian was the father of Glenn.

Bolton
 Darren Bolton
 Son: Shai Bolton
Darren is the father of Shai.

Bond 
Shane Bond
Troy Bond
Shane and Troy are brothers.

Bootsma 
 Brad Bootsma
 Son: Josh Bootsma
Brad is the father of Josh.

Bosustow
 Bob Bosustow
 Son: Peter Bosustow
 Son: Brent Bosustow
Bob is the father of Peter and Peter is the father of Brent.

Bourke (1) 
 Tim Bourke
Damian Bourke
 Son: Jordon Bourke
Damian and Tim are brothers and Damian is the father of Jordon.

Bourke (2) 
 Frank Bourke
 Francis Bourke
 David Bourke
Frank was the father of Francis and Francis is the father of David.

Bourke (3) 
Barry Bourke
Darren Bourke
Barry is the father of Darren.

Bowden 
Michael Bowden
Joel Bowden
Patrick Bowden
Sean Bowden
Michael was the father of Patrick, Sean and Joel.

Bower 

 Brendan Bower (Richmond, Essendon, North Melbourne)
 Darren Bower (Richmond)
 Nathan Bower (Richmond)

Brendan is the elder brother of Darren and Nathan.

Bowey
Belinda Bowey
Brett Bowey
Jake Bowey

Brett is Belinda's brother and Jake's father.

Boyle 
Stephen Boyle
Tim Boyle
Stephen is the father of Tim.

Braddy 
 Craig Braddy
 Shane Braddy
Craig is the elder brother of Shane.

Bradley 
 Rupe Bradley
 Syd Bradley
Rupe and Syd were brothers.

Bradshaw 
Daniel Bradshaw
Darren Bradshaw
Daniel is the elder brother of Darren.

Brady
 Campbell Brady
 Laurie Brady
Campbell and Laurie were brothers.

Brain
 Terry Brain
 Peter Brain
 Terry Brain Jr.
Terry was the father of Peter and Terry Jr.

Brayshaw
 Ian Brayshaw
 Mark Brayshaw
 Angus Brayshaw
 Hamish Brayshaw
 Andrew Brayshaw
Ian is the father of Mark, who is the father of Angus, Hamish and Andrew.

Brennan
 Michael Brennan
 Jacob Brennan
Michael is the father of Jacob.

Brewer 
Ian Brewer
Ross Brewer
Ian is the elder brother of Ross

Briedis
Arnold Briedis
Robert Briedis
Arnold and Robert are brothers.

Brittain
Craig Brittain
Wayne Brittain ( coach)
Wayne is the elder brother of Craig.

Broadbridge
Troy Broadbridge
Wayne Broadbridge
Wayne is the father of Troy.

Brooksby
Keegan Brooksby
Phil Brooksby
Phil is the father of Keegan.

Brophy
Bernie Brophy
Frank Brophy
Joe Brophy
Bernie, Frank and Joe were brothers.

Brown (1) 
Mal Brown
Campbell Brown
Mal is the father of Campbell.

Brown (2) 
Brian Brown
 Son: Jonathan Brown
Brian is the father of Jonathan.

Brown (3) 
Jack Brown
Ted Brown
 Son: Vin Brown
 Son: John Brown
Jack and Ted were brothers and Ted was the father of Vin and John.

Brown (4) 
Mitch Brown
Nathan Brown
Mitch and Nathan are identical twin brothers.

Brown (5) 
Gavin Brown
 Son: Callum Brown
 Son: Tyler Brown
 Daughter: Tarni Brown
Gavin is Callum, Tyler and Tarni's father.

Brown (6) 
Paul Brown
 Daughter: Millie Brown

Browne (1)
 Murray Browne
 Son: Alex Browne
Murray is the father of Alex.

Browne (2)
 Mort Browne
 Son: Morton Browne
Mort was the father of Morton.

Browne (3)
 Ricky Browne
 Mark Browne
Mark and Ricky are brothers.

Browning
 Keith Browning
 Son: Mark Browning
Keith is the father of Mark.

Brownlees
 Rupe Brownlees
 Tom Brownlees
Rupe and Tom were brothers.

Brownless
 Billy Brownless
 Oscar Luke Brownless
Billy is Oscar Luke's father

Bruce
 George Bruce
 Jim Bruce
 Percy Bruce
George, Jim and Percy were brothers.

Bryce
 Bob Bryce
 George Bryce
 Ted Bryce
Bob was the father of George and Ted.

Buckley (1)
 Brian W. Buckley
 Ben Buckley
Brian is the father of Ben.

Buckley (2)
 Jack Buckley
 Brian Buckley
 Mark Buckley
 Stephen Buckley
Jack is the father of Brian who is the father of Mark and Stephen.

Buckley (3)
 Ray Buckley
 Nathan Buckley
Ray is the father of Nathan.

Buckley (4)
 Jim Buckley
 Dylan Buckley
Jim is the father of Dylan.

Buckley (5)
 Ben Buckley
 Jack Buckley
Ben is the father of Jack.

Bunton
 Haydn Bunton Sr.
 Haydn Bunton Jr.
Haydn Sr. was the father of Haydn Jr.

Burgmann
 Jack Burgmann
 Lloyd Burgmann
 Shane Burgmann
Jack is the father of Lloyd and grandfather of Shane.

Burgoyne 
Peter Burgoyne Snr.
Peter Burgoyne
Shaun Burgoyne
Trent Burgoyne
Jase Burgoyne
Peter (Snr.) is the father of Peter and Shaun.
Peter (Jnr.) is the father of Trent

Shaun is the brother-in-law of Erin Phillips and son-in-law of Greg Phillips.

Burke (1)
 Gerald Burke
 Rohan Burke
Gerald is the father of Rohan.

Burke (2)
 Nathan Burke
 Alice Burke
Nathan is the father of Alice.

Burleigh
 Gordon Burleigh
 Wal Burleigh
Gordon and Wal were brothers.

Burns 
Allen Burns
Peter Burns
Allen and Peter were brothers.

Burton 
Peter Burton
Jay Burton
Matthew Burton
Travis Burton
Peter is the father of Matthew, Jay and Travis. All four played for Subiaco in the WAFL.

Busbridge 
Bill Busbridge (Essendon)
Norm Busbridge (Essendon)
Bill and Norm were brothers.

Butler 
Archie Butler
Charlie Butler
Archie and Charlie were brothers.

Buttsworth 
Fred Buttsworth
Wally Buttsworth
Wally is the elder brother of Fred

Byrne (1)
Bill Byrne
Charlie Byrne
Charlie is the older brother of Bill

Byrne (2)
Rex Byrne
Tom Byrne
Rex and Tom were brothers.

C

Cable 
Barry Cable
Shane Cable
Barry is Shane's father.

Cahill (1)
 Laurie Cahill
 Nephew: Darrell Cahill
 Nephew: John Cahill
Laurie was the uncle of Darrell and John.

Cahill (2)
 Pat Cahill
 Ted Cahill
Pat and Ted were brothers.

Callan
 Terry Callan
 Tim Callan
Terry is the father of Tim.

Caldwell 
Arthur Caldwell
Jim Caldwell
Arthur was the elder brother of Jim.

Calverley
 Bruce Calverley
 Des Calverley
 Graham Calverley
 Ray Calverley
Des is the brother of Bruce and the father of Graham and Ray. Graham is the elder brother of Ray.

Calwell
 George Calwell
 Clarrie Calwell
 Bert Calwell
Brothers who played in 1910s-1920s

Cameron
 Chris Cameron
 Bill Cameron
Chris was the father of Bill.

Campbell
 Des Campbell
 Blake Campbell
 Brad Campbell
Des is the father of Blake and Brad.

Campbell (2)
 Colin Campbell
 Norm Campbell
Colin and Norm were brothers.

Campbell (3)
 Basil Campbell
 Warren Campbell
Basil is Warren's father.

Card
 George Card
 Ray Card
George was the father of Ray.

Carmody
 Jack Carmody
 John Carmody
Jack was the father of John.

Carr 
Josh Carr
Matthew Carr
Josh and Matthew are brothers.

Carroll (1)
Nathan Carroll
Trent Carroll
Trent is the elder brother of Nathan.

Carroll (2)
 Tom Carroll
 Laurie Carroll
 Dennis Carroll
Laurie is the father of Dennis and the brother of Tom.

Carruthers
 Ron H. Carruthers
 Ron E. Carruthers
Ron H. was the father of Ron E.

Cassin 
Jack Cassin
John Cassin
Jack was the father of John.

Ceglar
David Ceglar
John Ceglar
David is the father of John.

Chadwick
 Bert Chadwick
 Bob Chadwick
Bert was the father of Bob.

Chamberlain
 Cornelius Chamberlain
 Jack Chamberlain
 Leonard Chamberlain
Cornelius, Jack and Leonard were brothers.

Chandler
 Gilbert Chandler
 Allan Chandler
Gil was the brother of Allan.

Chanter
 Fred Chanter
 Vic Chanter
Fred was the father of Vic.

Chapman
 Charlie Chapman
 James Chapman
Charlie was the father of James.

Charles
 John R. Charles
 Justin Charles
John is the father of Justin.

Chitty 
Bob Chitty
Peter Chitty
Peter was the elder brother of Bob.

Christensen 
Damien Christensen
Marty Christensen
Allen Christensen
Damien was the elder brother of Marty.
Allen is the nephew of Damien and Marty

Christou
Jim Christou
John Christou
Jim is the elder brother of John.

Clark
 Denis Clark
 Michael Clark
Denis is the father of Michael.

Clarke (1) 
Raphael Clarke
Xavier Clarke
Raphael and Xavier are brothers.

Clarke (2) 
Tom Clarke
Jack Clarke
Tom was the father of Jack.

Clarke (3) 
David Clarke
David Clarke
Tim Clarke
David E. is the father of Tim and David A.

Clarke (4) 
Fred Clarke
Neil Clarke
Fred was the father of Neil.

Clay 
Bert Clay
Ivor Clay
Bert and Ivor were twin brothers.

Clayton
Scott Clayton
Josh Clayton
Scott is the father of Josh.

Clegg 
Brian Clegg
Ron Clegg
Ron was the elder brother of Brian.

Cloke 
Peter Cloke (Richmond, North Adelaide, Oakleigh)
David Cloke
Cameron Cloke (Collingwood, Carlton, Port Adelaide, Williamstown, Preston)
Jason Cloke
Travis Cloke
David is the father of Cameron, Jason and Travis. Peter is David's elder brother.

Coates
 George Coates
 Michael Coates
George was the father of Michael.

Cochrane
 Richard Cochrane (Central District)
 Stuart Cochrane (& Central District)
Richard is the father of Stuart.

Cock
 Arthur Cock
 Eric Cock
 Herbert Cock
Arthur, Eric and Herbert were brothers.

Cockatoo-Collins
 Che Cockatoo-Collins
 David Cockatoo-Collins
 Donald Cockatoo-Collins
Che, David and Donald are brothers.

Collier 
Albert Collier
Harry Collier
Albert and Harry were brothers.

Collins (1) 
Goldie Collins
Harry Collins
Norm Collins
Goldie, Harry and Norm were brothers. Both Harry and Norm died before the age of 30.

Collins (2)
Jim Collins
Allan Collins
Jack Collins
Jim is the father of Allan and Jack.

Collins (3)
 Jack Collins
 Daryl Collins
 Denis Collins
Jack was the father of Denis and Daryl.

Collins (4)
 Jack Collins
 Geoff Collins
 Mike Collins
Jack was the father of Geoff and Mike.

Comben
 Aubrey Comben
 Bruce Comben
 John Comben
Aubrey was the father of Bruce and John.

Connolly
 Barry Connolly
 Chris Connolly
Barry is the father of Chris.

Considine
 Bernie Considine
 Frank Considine
 Maurie Considine
 Paul Considine
Bernie, Maurie and Frank are brothers, Paul is Maurie's son.

Conway
 Isaac Conway
 Sophie Conway
Isaac is the elder brother of Sophie. Both have been on Brisbane Lions lists, in the AFL and AFL Women's respectively.

Cook
 Fred Cook
 Keith Cook
Fred and Keith were twins.

Cooper 
Graham Cooper
Ian Cooper
Graham is the elder brother of Ian.

Coppock
 Fred Coppock
 Kevin Coppock
Fred was the father of Kevin.

Cordner 
Henry (Harry) Cordner
Edward Rae Cordner
George Denis (Denis) Cordner
Donald Pruen (Don) Cordner
 Granddaughter: Harriet Cordner
John Pruen Cordner
Edward Pruen (Ted) Cordner
David Baillieu Cordner
 Cousin: Laurence Osmaston (Larry) Cordner
 Cousin: Joseph Alan (Alan) Cordner

Edward Rae Cordner was the brother of Harry Cordner and the father of Ted, Don, Denis and John Cordner.

Ted Cordner was the father of David Cordner. Edward Rae Cordner and Harry Cordner were first cousins of Larry Cordner and Alan Cordner (who were half-brothers).
 
Harriet Cordner is the granddaughter of 1946 Brownlow Medallist Don Cordner, she is the first grandfather-granddaughter recruit to play AFL in the Women's League (AFLW).

Cordy 
Graeme Cordy
Neil Cordy
Brian Cordy
Ayce Cordy
Zaine Cordy
Brian, Graeme and Neil are brothers. Ayce and Zaine are sons of Brian.

Corrigan/Robertson 
 Tommy Corrigan
 Leigh Robertson (born 21 May 1950)
 Glenn Robertson (born 1 November 1952)
Leigh and Glenn are brothers, and are the grandsons of Tom Corrigan.

Cornes 
Graham Cornes
Chad Cornes
Kane Cornes
Graham is the father of Chad and Kane.

Couch
 Paul Couch
 Tom Couch
Paul is the father of Tom.

Cousins 
Bryan Cousins
Ben Cousins
Bryan is the father of Ben.

Coventry 
Gordon Coventry
Hugh Coventry
Syd Coventry
Syd Coventry Jr.
James Walker
Alex Denney 
Gordon and Syd were brothers. Syd was the father of Hugh and Syd Jr. James is Gordon's great-grandson.

Cranage
 Paul Cranage
 Sam Cranage
Paul is the father of Sam.

Crane
Jack Crane
Len Crane
Tom Crane
Jack was the elder brother of Len and Tom.

Crapper
 Frank Crapper
 Fred Crapper
 Harry Crapper
All three are brothers.

Crawford 
Justin Crawford
Shane Crawford
Shane is the elder brother of Justin.

Crimmins
 Bryan Crimmins
 Peter Crimmins
Bryan was the father of Peter.

Cross
 Joel Cross (South Adelaide)
 Mark Cross
Mark is the father of Joel.

Crosswell/Kavanagh
 Brent Crosswell
 Tom Kavanagh
Brent is the father of Tom.

Crouch
Brad Crouch
Matt Crouch
Brad and Matt are brothers.

Crow
 Justin Crow
 Max Crow
Max is the father of Justin

Cummings/Johnson
 Percy Cummings
 Robert Cummings
 Trent Cummings
 Joe Johnson
 Percy Johnson
Percy Cummings is the father of Robert and Trent. Joe was the father of Percy Johnson and grandfather of Percy Cummings.

Cunningham (1)
 Jack Cunningham
 John Cunningham
 Tom Cunningham
Tom was the father of Jack and Jack is the father of John.

Cunningham (2)
 Daryl Cunningham
 Geoff Cunningham
Daryl and Geoff are brothers.

Curran
 Kevin Curran
 Pat Curran
Kevin was the father of Pat.

D

Daicos 
Peter Daicos
Josh Daicos
Nick Daicos
Peter is Josh's and Nick's father.

Dalton 
Bill Dalton
Jack Dalton
Bill was the elder brother of Jack

Daly
Anthony "Bos" Daly
John "Bunny" Daly
Bunny was the elder brother of Bos

Daniher 
Anthony Daniher
Darcy Daniher
Joe Daniher
Chris Daniher
Neale Daniher
Terry Daniher
Anthony is the father of Darcy and Joe and the brother of Chris, Neale and Terry.

Darcy 
David Darcy
Luke Darcy
David is Luke's father.

Davey 
Aaron Davey
Alwyn Davey
Aaron and Alwyn are brothers.

Davidson 
Garry Davidson
Tom Davidson
Garry is the father of Tom.

Davis (1)
Craig Davis
Nick Davis
Craig is the father of Nick.

Davis (2)
 Allan Davis
 Chad Davis
Allan is the father of Chad.

Daykin 
Bert Daykin
Percy Daykin
Richard Daykin
Bert was the elder brother of Percy and Richard.

Dayman 
 Clem Dayman
 Les Dayman
 Lisle Dayman (Son)

Les was the younger brother of Clem and is the grandfather of Chris McDermott who was the Adelaide Crows first captain.

Dean
 Fred Dean
 Ken Dean
 Norm Dean
Fred was the father of Ken and Norm.

Dear 
Greg Dear
Paul Dear
Harry Dear 
Greg is the elder brother of Paul, Harry is the son of Paul

Deas 
Bob Deas
Jack Deas
Jack was the elder brother of Bob

De Koning
Sam De Koning
Terry De Koning
Tom de Koning

Terry is the father of Sam and Tom.

Delahunty 
Hugh Delahunty
Mike Delahunty
Hugh is the elder brother of Mike.

Deledio 
Wayne Deledio
Brett Deledio
Wayne is Brett's father

Deluca 
Adrian Deluca
Fabian Deluca
Adrian is Fabian's elder brother

Demetriou 
Andrew Demetriou
Jim Demetriou
Jim is the elder brother of Andrew.

Dempster 
Graham Dempster
Sean Dempster
Graham is the father of Sean.

Dick
 Alec Dick
 Billy Dick
 Robert Dick
Alec and Robert were brothers. Billy was the son of Alec.

Dimattina 
Frank Dimattina
Paul Dimattina
Andrew Dimattina
Frank is the father of Paul and Andrew.

Dixon
 Joe Dixon
 Ben Dixon
Joe is the father of Ben.

Doig 
George Doig
Norm Doig
Ron Doig Sr.
All three are first cousins. Another 14 members of the family have played in the WAFL over the years, for a combined total of 39 premierships and 35 runners-up.

Donnelly 
Andy Donnelly
Gerry Donnelly
Andy and Gerry were brothers.

Dowsing
 Alf Dowsing
 Rob Dowsing
 Roy Dowsing
Alf was the father of Roy and the grandfather of Rob.

Doyle
 Robert Doyle
 Stephen Doyle
Robert is the father of Stephen.

Drum 
Damian Drum
Marcus Drum
Damian is Marcus' uncle.

Duckworth 
Billy Duckworth
John Duckworth
John is the elder brother of Billy.

Dugdale
 Dean Dugdale
 Glenn Dugdale
 John Dugdale
John is the father of Dean and Glenn.

Dullard
 Adrian Dullard
 Tony Dullard
Adrian was the father of Tony.

Dummett
 Alf Dummett
 Charlie Dummett
Alf was the elder brother of Charlie.

Dunbar
 Edgar Dunbar
 Harold Dunbar
 Hugh Dunbar
Edgar, Harold and Hugh were brothers.

Duncan 
 Mitch Duncan
 Glen Rogers

Dunell
 Frank Dunell
 Sam Dunell
Frank is the father of Sam.

Dunn
 Harvey Dunn Jr.
 Harvey Dunn Sr.
Harvey Sr. was the father of Harvey Jr.

Dunstan
 Graeme Dunstan
 Ian Dunstan
 Maurie Dunstan
Maurie is the father of Graeme and Ian.

Dwyer
 Anthony Dwyer
 David Dwyer
 Laurie Dwyer
 Leo Dwyer
Leo was the father of Laurie and grandfather of Anthony and David. Leo was also the uncle of Keith Harper.

Dyer
 Jack Dyer
 Jack Dyer Jr.
Jack was the father of Jack Jr.

E

Eason 
Alec Eason
Bill Eason
Dick Eason
Alec and Bill were brothers. Alec was the father of Dick.

Easton
 Kevin Easton
 Stephen Easton
Kevin was the father of Stephen.

Ebert 
Brad Ebert
Brett Ebert
Craig Ebert
Jeff Ebert
Russell Ebert
Ricky Ebert
Russell is the brother of Craig and father of Brett. Craig is the father of Brad. Jeff is the brother of Russell and Craig.

Edmond 
Bob Edmond
Jim Edmond
Bob was the elder brother of Jim.

Edwards (1) 
 Alan Edwards
 Doug Edwards
 Greg Edwards
 Kym Edwards
Russell Edwards
 Shane Edwards
Alan was the father of Doug, the grandfather of Greg and Russell and the great-grandfather of Kym and Shane.

Edwards (2)
 Tyson Edwards
 Jackson Edwards

Jackson is the son of Tyson.

Egan/Lovett
 Alf Egan
 Ted Lovett
Alf was the father of Ted.

Elliott 
 Bruce Elliott
Glenn Elliott
Robert Elliott
Bruce, Glenn and Robert are brothers.

Ellis
 Kingsley Ellis
 Lindsay Ellis
 Ted Ellis
Ted was the father of Kingsley and Lindsay.

Emselle 
Ken Emselle
Richie Emselle
Richie was the father of Ken.

Erwin
 Michael Erwin
 Mick Erwin
Mick is the father of Michael.

Evans (1)
 Alfie Evans
 Rodney Evans
Alfie was the father of Rodney.

Evans (2)
Neil Evans
Ron Evans
Ron was the elder brother of Neil.

Everitt 
Andrejs Everitt
Peter Everitt
Peter is the elder brother of Andrejs.

F

Fanning
 Fred Fanning
 John Fanning
Fred was the father of John.

Farmer
 Horrie Farmer
 Horrie H. Farmer
Horrie H. was the father of Horrie.

Farrant
 Doug Farrant
 Gary Farrant
Gary is the elder brother of Doug.

Febey 
Matthew Febey
Steven Febey
Matthew and Steven are twins.

Fehring 
Arthur Fehring
Charlie Fehring
Charlie was the elder brother of Arthur.

Feldmann
 Derek Feldmann
 Rick Feldmann
Derek and Rick are brothers.

Fellowes 
Graeme Fellowes
Wes Fellowes
Graeme is the father of Wes.

Ferguson
 Jack T. Ferguson
 John K. Ferguson
Jack was the father of John.

Fidge
 John Fidge
 Ted Fidge
John and Ted are brothers.

Fields
 Neville Fields
 Tom Fields
Neville is Tom's father.

Fincher 
Charlie Fincher
Jack Fincher
Charlie was the elder brother of Jack.

Fleming 
Ian Fleming
Keith Fleming
Ian and Keith were twins.

Fletcher (1) 
Ken Fletcher
Dustin Fletcher
Ken is Dustin's father.

Fletcher (2) 
 Daniel Fletcher
 Simon Fletcher
Daniel and Simon are brothers.

Flower
 Robert Flower
 Tom Flower
Robbie and Tom are brothers.

Fogarty
 Tom Fogarty
 Chris Fogarty
 John Fogarty
 Joe Fogarty
 Tom Fogarty Jr.
Tom, Chris, John, and Joe were brothers. Tom Fogarty Jr. is the son of Tom B. Fogarty.

Foster
 Jack Foster
 Rob Foster
Jack was the father of Rob.

Fox
 Arthur Fox Jr.
 Arthur Fox Sr.
Arthur Sr. was the father of Arthur Jr.

Francis (1)
 Jack Francis
 Jim Francis
 Syd Francis
Jack, Jim and Syd were brothers.

Francis (2)
 Fabian Francis
 Jason Horne-Francis
Fabian is Jason's father.

Fraser (1) 
Don Fraser Jr.
Don Fraser Sr.
Don Sr. was the father of Don Jr.

Fraser (2) 
Ken Fraser
Mark Fraser
Ken is the father of Mark.

Freeborn 
Glenn Freeborn
Scott Freeborn
Glenn is the elder brother of Scott.

Frost 
Jack Frost
Sam Frost
Jack and Sam are brothers.

G

Galbally 
Frank Galbally
Jack Galbally
Bob Galbally
Jack was the elder brother of Frank and Bob.

Gale 
Brendon Gale
Jack Gale
Michael Gale
Jack was the grandfather of brothers Brendon and Michael.

Gallagher
 Jim Gallagher
 Ross Gallagher
Jim was the father of Ross.

Garbutt
 Joe Garbutt Jr.
 Joe Garbutt
Joe was the father of Joe Jr.

Gardner
 Corrie Gardner
 Eric Gardner
 Mark Gardner
Corrie, Eric and Mark were brothers.

Gardiner (1)
Jack Gardiner
Vin Gardiner
Jack was the elder brother of Vin.

Gardiner (2)
 Alex Gardiner Sr.
 Alex Gardiner
Alex Sr. was the father of Alex.

Gardner 
Corrie Gardner
Eric Gardner
Corrie was the elder brother of Eric.

Garlick 
 George Garlick Sr.
 George Garlick
George Sr. was the father of George.

Gaspar 
Damien Gaspar
Darren Gaspar
Travis Gaspar
Damien, Darren and Travis are brothers

Gaudion 
Charlie Gaudion
Michael Gaudion
Charlie was the father of Michael.

Georgiades
John Georgiades 
 Mitch Georgiades Port Adelaide
John is the father of Mitch.

Gerrand
 Bill Gerrand Sr.
 Bill Gerrand Jr.
Bill was the father of Bill Jr.

Gibb
 Len Gibb
 Percy Gibb
 Reg Gibb
 Ray Gibb
 Rupert Gibb
Reg was the father of Ray and brother of Len, Percy and Rupert.

Gibbs 
Bryce Gibbs
Ross Gibbs
Ross is the father of Bryce.

Giles
 Glenn Giles
 Peter Giles
Glenn and Peter are brothers.

Gill (1) 
Barry Gill
John Gill
John is the elder brother of Barry.

Gill (2) 
 Dick Gill
 Frank Gill
Frank was the father of Dick.

Gillespie 
Dave Gillespie
Doug Gillespie
Dave and Doug were twin brothers

Gilmore 
Brian Gilmore
Daniel Gilmore
Brian is the grandfather of Daniel.

Glascott 
David Glascott
Stuart Glascott
David is the elder brother of Stuart.

Gleeson
Adrian Gleeson
Martin Gleeson
Adrian is the uncle of Martin.

Glendinning
Gus Glendinning
Ross Glendinning
Gus was the father of Ross.

Goggin
 Bill Goggin
 Matt Goggin
Bill and Matt are brothers.

Gomez
 Frank Gomez Sr.
 Frank Gomez Jr.
Frank Sr. is the father of Frank Jr.

Goodes
 Adam Goodes
 Brett Goodes
Adam and Brett are brothers.

Goonan
 Jim H. Goonan
 Jimmy Goonan
Jim is the father of Jimmy.

Goss
 Kevin Goss
 Norm Goss Jr.
 Norm Goss Sr.
 Paul Goss
Norm is the father of Kevin, Norm and Paul.

Gotch
 Brad Gotch
 Graham Gotch
 Xavier Gotch
Graham is the father of Brad. Brad is the father of Xavier.

Gotz
 Bruce Gotz
 Martin Gotz
Martin was the father of Bruce.

Gowans 
Chris Gowans
James Gowans
Chris and James are twins. Their father Peter Gowans was a premiership player for Victorian Football Association (VFA) club Caulfield.

Gowers 
 Billy Gowers
 Andrew Gowers
 Trevor Gowers
Andrew is the son of Trevor and father of Bill.

Grace 
 Jim Grace
 Joe Grace
 Mick Grace
Jim was the eldest brother; Joe was the youngest.

Graham 
Ben Graham
Jack Graham
Ricky Graham
Jack was the father of Ricky and grandfather of Ben. Ricky is Ben's uncle.

Grainger
 Gary Grainger
 George Grainger
George is the father of Gary.

Grambeau
 Mick Grambeau
 Son: Shane Grambeau

Grant
 Chris Grant
 Daughter: Isabella Grant

Green (1)
Bob Green
Jack Green
Bob and Jack were brothers.

Green (2)
 Jack Green Sr.
 Jack Green Jr.
 Jack Green III
Jack Sr. was the father of Jack Jr. and the grandfather of Jack III.

Greene
 Russell Greene
 Steven Greene
Russell is the father of Steven.

Greeves
 Edward Greeves Jr.
 Ted Greeves
Ted was the father of Edward.

Grima
Alex Grima: Glenelg,  rookie list, 
Nathan Grima: 
Todd Grima: Glenelg,  rookie list,  (VFL)
Nathan is the oldest brother, Alex is the youngest

Grimes
Dylan Grimes
Jack Grimes
Jack is the older brother of Dylan.

Grimley
 Brett Grimley
 Ken Grimley
 Sam Grimley
Ken is the father of Brett, who is the father of Sam.

Guinane
 Danny Guinane
 Paddy Guinane
Danny was the father of Paddy.

Gull
 Jim Gull
 Stewart Gull
Jim was the father of Stewart.

Gunn/Ward
 Bill Gunn
 Callan Ward

Bill Gunn is the grandfather of Callan Ward.

H

Hacker
 Alf Hacker
 Jack Hacker
Alf was the elder brother of Jack.

Hall
 Grahame Hall
 Peter Hall
Grahame was the father of Peter.

Hallahan
 Jim Hallahan Jr.
 Jim Hallahan Sr.
 Mike Hallahan
 Tom Hallahan
Jim Sr. was the father of Jim Jr. and Tom and the grandfather of Mike.

Halloran
 Danny Halloran
 Frank Halloran
Frank was the father of Danny.

Hammond
 Billy Hammond
 Charlie Hammond
 Jack Hammond
Jack was the elder of the three brothers, and Billy was the younger.

Hank
 Barry Hank
Bill Hank
 Bob Hank
 Ray Hank

Bill, Bob and Ray were brothers. Barry is Bob's son.

Hanley
Pearce Hanley
Cian Hanley
Pearce is the elder brother of Cian. Both have been listed for the Brisbane Lions, whilst Pierce has also played for Gold Coast.

Hannebery
 Dan Hannebery
 Mark Hannebery
 Matt Hannebery
 Ian Aitken
 Luke O'Sullivan
Matt is the father of Dan and younger brother of Mark. Luke O'Sullivan is the brother of Matt's wife. Ian Aitken is married to the sister of Matt's wife.

Hanton
 Alex Hanton
 Harold Hanton
Alec and Harold were twin brothers.

Hardiman 
 Jack Hardiman
Les Hardiman
Peter Hardiman
Jack was the father of Peter and Les.

Hardy
 Charlie Hardy
 Jack Hardy
Charlie was the father of Jack.

Hargrave
 Ryan Hargrave
 Steve Hargrave
Steve is the father of Ryan.

Harris (1)
 Bernie Harris
 Leon Harris
Leon is the elder brother of Bernie

Harris (2)
 Brenton Harris
 Darren Harris
Darren is the elder brother of Brenton

Hart
 Arthur Hart
 Don Hart
 Eddie Hart
* 
Arthur, Don, and Eddie  were brothers.

Hartigan
 Brent Hartigan
 Dean Hartigan
 Jack Hartigan
Jack was the father of Dean and grandfather of Brent.

Harvey (1)
Anthony Harvey
Robert Harvey
Robert is the elder brother of Anthony

Harvey (2)
Bill Harvey
Brent Harvey
Shane Harvey
Brent is the elder brother of Shane. Bill is their grandfather.

Hawking 
Fred Hawking
Simon Hawking
Fred was Simon's grandfather.

Hawkins 
Jack Hawkins
Michael Hawkins
Robb Hawkins
Tom Hawkins
Fred Le Deux
Jack, Michael and Robb are brothers. Jack is Tom's father. Fred is Tom's grandfather and Jack's father-in-law.

Hay (1)
Bill Hay
Phil Hay
Sted Hay
Bill, Phil and Sted were brothers.

Hay (2)
 Ced Hay
 Harold Hay
Ced and Harold were brothers.

Hayes
 Phonse Hayes
 John Hayes
Phonse and John were brothers.

Haynes
 Tiah Haynes
 John Haynes (Perth)
John is Tiah's father.

Heal
 Graham Heal
 Stan Heal
Stan was the father of Graham.

Healy 
Gerard Healy
Greg Healy
Bill O'Brien
Gerard and Greg are brothers. Bill O'Brien was their grandfather.

Heenan
 Jim F. Heenan
 Jim P. Heenan
Jim F. was the father of Jim P.

Hellwig
 Gordon Hellwig
 Herman Hellwig
Herman was the father of Gordon.

Higgins/Orr
 Shaun Higgins
 Danielle Orr

Higgins is Orr's brother.

Hill
 Bradley Hill
 Stephen Hill
Stephen is the elder brother of Bradley.

Hinge
John Hinge
Mitch Hinge
John is the elder brother of Mitch.

Hinman 
Arthur Hinman
Bill Hinman
Arthur and Bill were brothers

Hird 
Allan Hird Sr.
Allan Hird Jr.
James Hird
Allan is the father of Allan Jr. and the grandfather of James.

Hiskins 
Arthur Hiskins
Fred Hiskins
Rupe Hiskins
Stan Hiskins
Jack Hiskins
Arthur, Fred, Rupe and Stan were brothers. Jack was the son of Fred.

Hocking (1)
Garry Hocking
Steven Hocking
Brett rhode cosin

Hocking (2)
Graham Hocking
Heath Hocking
Graham is the father of Heath.

Hodgkin 
Frank Hodgkin
Bob Hodgkin
Frank is the elder brother of Robert.

Hogan 
Jesse Hogan
Tony Hogan 
Tony is the father of Jesse

Hoiles
 John E. Hoiles
 John M. Hoiles
John E. Hoiles is father of John M. Hoiles

Holland 
Ben Holland
Nick Holland
Ben and Nick are brothers.

Hollands 
Ben Hollands
Elijah Hollands
Ben is the father of Elijah.

Hollick
Greg Hollick
Monique Hollick
Greg is the father of Monique.

Horman 
 George Horman
 James Horman
James is the older brother of George.

Horkings
 Ray Horkings
 Reg Horkings
Reg was the father of Ray.

Hosking (1)
 Ron Hosking
 Scott Hosking
Ron is the father of Scott.

Hosking (2)
Jess Hosking
Sarah Hosking
Jess and Sarah are twin sisters.

Houghton
Gemma Houghton
Joel Houghton (Perth, Swan Districts & East Perth)
Gemma and Joel are siblings.

Houlihan 
Adam Houlihan
Damian Houlihan
Ryan Houlihan
Adam, Damian and Ryan  are brothers. Another sibling, Josh, was recruited by St Kilda but never played in the AFL.

Hovey
 Ced Hovey
 Jim Hovey
 Ron Hovey
 Wayne Hovey
Ron, Ced and Jim are brothers, Jim is the father of Wayne.

Howell (1) 
Jack P. Howell
Jack Howell jnr
Scott Howell
Jack P was the father of Jack Jnr and the grandfather of Scott.

Howell (2) 
Bevis Howell
Verdun Howell
Bevis and Verdun were brothers. Bevis won the 1952 Grogan Medal in Queensland

Howson
Herb Howson
Henry Howson
Henry and Herb were brothers.

Hudson
Paul Hudson
Peter Hudson
Peter is Paul's father. Simon Minton-Connell is Paul's cousin.

Huggard
 Jack Huggard
 Jackie Huggard
Jack was the father of Jackie.

Hughes
 Frank 'Checker' Hughes
 Frank Hughes Jr.
Frank was the father of Frank Jr.

Hughson 
 Mick Hughson
 Les Hughson
 Les Hughson Jr.
 Fred Hughson
 Denis Hughson
Les, Mick and Fred were brothers, Les was the father of Les Jr. and Fred was the father of Denis.

Hunter
 Cameron Hunter
 Ken Hunter
Ken is the father of Cameron.

Huntington
 Jack Huntington
 Les Huntington
 Stan Huntington
 Bill Huntington
Jack, Les and Stan were brothers. Bill is the son of Stan.

Huppatz
 Eric Huppatz
 Kevin Huppatz
Kevin was the son of Eric.

Hurn
 William Hurn
 Shannon Hurn
William is the father of Shannon.

I

Icke
 Bill Icke
 Laurie Icke
 Steven Icke
Laurie is the brother of Bill and the father of Steven.

Incigneri
 Len Incigneri
 Matt Incigneri
Len and Matt were brothers.

Ion
Barry Ion
Graham Ion
Graham is the elder brother of Barry.

Irwin
Frank Irwin
Vince Irwin
Frank is the elder brother of Vince.

J

Jack 
Brandon Jack
Kieren Jack
Brandon is the younger brother of Kieren, both are sons of rugby league legend Garry Jack.

Jakovich 
Gary Jakovich
Allen Jakovich
Glen Jakovich
Gary (played for ), Allen and Glen are brothers.

James (1) 
Brett James
Roger James
Paul James
Brett and Roger and Paul are siblings – Brett and Roger played AFL and SANFL and Paul played SANFL.

James (2)
 John James
 Michael James
John is the father of Michael.

James (3) 
Max James
Heath James
Max is the father of Heath.

James (4) 
Fred James
Les James
Syd James
Fred, Les and Syd were brothers.

Jarman 
Andrew Jarman
Darren Jarman
Ben Jarman
Andrew and Darren are brothers. Ben is the son of Darren.

Jeffrey
 Joel Jeffrey
 Russell Jeffrey

Russell is Joel's father.

Jewell 
Nick Jewell
Tony Jewell
Tony is the father of Nick.

John
 Graeme John
 Gareth John

Graeme is the father of Gareth.

Johns
 Alwyn Johns
 Keith Johns

Alwyn and Keith were brothers.

Johnson(1) 
Bob B. Johnson
Bob C. Johnson
Bob C. is Bob B's father.

Johnson (2) 
Alan Johnson
Chris Johnson
Alan is the father of Chris.

Johnson (3) 
David Johnson
Mark Johnson
Mark is the elder brother of David.

Johnston 
Jack Johnston
Charlie Johnston
Charlie and Jack are brothers.

Johnstone 
Norm Johnstone
Travis Johnstone
Norm is the grandfather of Travis.

Jones (1) 
Brett Jones
Chad Jones
Brett is the elder brother of Chad.

Jones (2) 
Nathan Jones
Zak Jones
Nathan is the elder brother of Zak.

Jones (3) 
Bob Jones
Liam Jones
Bob is Liam's father.

K

Kappler
 Darren Kappler
 David Kappler
Darren and David are brothers.

Kearney
Dan Kearney
Jim Kearney
Jim was the father of Dan.

Keating 
Aaron Keating
Clark Keating
Aaron and Clark are brothers.

Keeffe
Lachlan Keeffe
Jessy Keeffe
Lachlan is the elder brother of Jessy. Lachlan has played for Collingwood in the AFL, and Jessy has been listed for Brisbane in the AFL Women's.

Kekovich 
Brian Kekovich
Sam Kekovich
Brian and Sam are brothers.

Kellaway 
Andrew Kellaway
Duncan Kellaway
Andrew and Duncan are brothers.

Kelly
 Bill Kelly
 Joe Kelly
Bill was the  father of Joe.

Kelly (2)
 Ernie Kelly
 Harvey Kelly
 Otto Kelly
All three were brothers

Kelly (3)
 Craig Kelly
 Jake Kelly

Craig is the father of Jake.

Kelly (4)
 Phil Kelly
 Josh Kelly

Phil is the father of Josh.

Kennedy (1)
John Kennedy Sr.
John Kennedy Jr.
Josh Kennedy
John Sr. is John Jr.'s father, Josh is John Jr.'s son and his maternal grandfather is Felix Russo.

Kennedy (2)
 Des Kennedy
 Matthew Kennedy
Des is the father of Matthew.

Kennedy (3) 
James Kennedy
Ted Kennedy
Ted was the elder brother of James

Kenny
 Bill Kenny
 Billy Kenny
Billy was the father of Bill.

Kernahan 
David Kernahan
Harry Kernahan
Stephen Kernahan
Harry is the father of David and Stephen.

Kerr (1)
 Laurie Kerr
 Peter Kerr
Laurie is the father of Peter.

Kerr (2)
 Daniel Kerr
 Roger Kerr
Roger is the father of Daniel.

Kerr (3)
 Alex Kerr
 Bill Kerr
Alex and Bill were brothers.

Kick
 Murray Kick
 Ned Kick
Ned was the father of Murray.

King 
Clinton King
Derek King
Derek was the father of Clinton. Derek's father Robert King played for Brighton in the VFA.

Kinnear 
Bill Kinnear
Joe Kinnear
Joe was the elder brother of Bill. The son of Joe, Col Kinnear, coached the Sydney Swans.

Knight
 Graham Knight
 Phillip Knight
Graham is the father of Philip.

Knott
 Dan Knott (footballer)
 Arch Knott
Dan and Arch are brothers.

Kol
 Michael Kol
 Nigel Kol
Michael and Nigel are identical twins.

Krakouer 
Andrew J. Krakouer
Andrew L. Krakouer
Jim Krakouer
Nathan Krakouer
Phil Krakouer
Jim, Phil and Andrew L. are brothers, Andrew J is Jim's son. Nathan is a cousin of Andrew J.

Kruse
 Max Kruse, Sr. (Prahran) 
 Max Kruse, Jr. (Sydney Swans), (Glenelg)
Max Sr. is the father of Max Jr.

Kuhl
 Harry Kuhl
 Jim Kuhl
Harry was the father of Jim.

L

Laird
Chris Laird
Frank Laird
Chris and Frank were twin brothers.

Lane 
Eddie Lane
Clarrie Lane
Eddie was the elder brother of Clarrie.

Lambert 
Chris Lambert
Harold Lambert
Chris was the elder brother of Harold

Langdon
 Ed Langdon
 Tom Langdon
Tom is the elder brother of Ed
They are also related to the Cordner family.  Their great-grandmother was Sylvia Cordner, a first cousin of Edward Rae, Harry, Larry and Alan Cordner, making Tom and Ed their first cousins thrice-removed.

Langford 
Chris Langford
Will Langford
Lachlan Langford
Chris is the father of Will and Lachlan.

Laurie 
Jesse Laurie (Port Adelaide rookie, Claremont)
Parris Laurie
Jesse and Parris are siblings.

Lawrence 
Barry Lawrence
Steven Lawrence
Barry is the father of Steven.

Leach 
Arthur Leach
Fred Leach
 Ted Leach
Arthur, Fred and Ted were brothers.

Leahy 
Brian Leahy
John Leahy
Terry Leahy
Brian, John and Terry are all brothers.

LeCras 
Peter LeCras
Brent LeCras
Mark LeCras
Peter (East Fremantle) is the father of Brent and Mark.

Leehane
 Steve Leehane
 Ted Leehane
 Tom Leehane
Steve was the father of Ted and Tom.

Le Messurrier 
 Alfred Le Messurrier
 Albert Le Messurrier
 Alfred Roy Le Messurier
 Edward Le Messurrier
 Ernest Le Messurrier

The Le Messurrier's were a prominent Port Adelaide business family that played a large part in the early years of the  Football Club.

Lenaghan 
 Denis Lenaghan
 Mick Lenaghan
Denis is the elder brother of Mick.

Lester-Smith
 Neil Lester-Smith
 Rod Lester-Smith
 Ryan Lester-Smith
Rod and Neil are brothers, Ryan is Neil's son.

Lewis 
 Irwin Lewis
 Clayton Lewis 
 Cameron Lewis
 Chris Lewis 
Irwin Lewis is the father of Clayton, Cameron, and Chris.

Liberatore
 Tony Liberatore
 Tom Liberatore
Tony is the father of Tom.

Lill
 Alick Lill
 John Lill
Alick was the father of John.

Linton
 Alby "Curly" Linton
 Alby Linton
Alby Sr. is the father of Alby.

Lisle/Milnes
Brian Milnes
Mark Lisle
Jordan Lisle
Brian is the grandfather of Jordan, and Mark is the father of Jordan.

Lloyd 
Brad Lloyd
John Lloyd
Matthew Lloyd
John is the father of Brad and Matthew.

Lockwood 
George Lockwood
Teddy Lockwood
George and Teddy were twin brothers

Longmire 
John Longmire
Robert Longmire
Keith Williams
Keith Williams is the grandfather of John Longmire. Robert is the uncle of John.

Longmuir 
Justin Longmuir
Troy Longmuir
Justin and Troy are brothers

Lonie 
Nathan Lonie
Ryan Lonie
Nathan and Ryan are identical twins

Lord (1)
Alistair Lord
Stewart Lord
Alistair and Stewart are twin brothers.

Lord (2)
 Jack Lord
 John Lord
Jack was the father of John.

Lower 
Ed Lower
Nick Lower
Ed and Nick are twins.

Lucas (1)
 George Lucas
 Peter Lucas
George was the father of Peter.

Lucas (2)
Jack Lucas
Kane Lucas
Jack is the father of Kane.

Luff
 Bill Luff Sr.
 Bill Luff
Bill Sr. was the father of Bill.

Lunn
 Ron Lunn
 Stephen Lunn
Ron is the father of Stephen.

Lugg
Gary Lugg
Rheanne Lugg
Gary is the father of Rheanne.

Lynch (1)
 Fred Lynch
 Paul Lynch
Fred is the father of Paul.

Lynch (2)
 Bethany Lynch
 Tom Lynch
Tom is Bethany's brother.

Lyon (1) 
Garry Lyon
Peter Lyon
Peter is the father of Garry.

Lyon (2) 
Maurie Lyon
Ross Lyon
Maurie is the father of Ross.

Lyons 
Marty Lyons
Jarryd Lyons
Corey Lyons
Marty is the father of Jarryd and Corey.

M

Mackie 
Gordon Mackie
Ken Mackie
Gordon was the elder brother of Ken.

MacPherson 
Rod MacPherson
Stephen MacPherson
Darcy MacPherson
Rod is the elder brother of Stephen. Darcy is Stephen's son.

Macrae 
Finlay Macrae
Jack Macrae
Finlay and Jack are brothers.

Madden 
Justin Madden
Simon Madden
Justin and Simon are brothers.

Magin
Alik Magin
Rhys Magin
Alik is the younger brother of Rhys.

Maginness
 Norm Maginness
 Scott Maginness
 Finn Maginness
Norm is the father of Scott and Scott is the father of Finn.

Malakellis
 Spiro Malakellis
 Tony Malakellis
Spiro is the elder brother of Tony.

Mann
 Ken Mann
 Peter Mann
Ken is the father of Peter.

Marchesi
 Gerald Marchesi
 Peter Marchesi
 Val Marchesi
Val was the father of Gerald and Peter.

Marsham
 Alan Marsham
 Harry Marsham
Harry was the father of Alan.

Martyn 
Bryan Martyn
Mick Martyn
Bryan was the father of Mick.

Matera 
Peter Matera
Phillip Matera
Wally Matera
Brandon Matera
Wally is the elder brother of Peter and Phillip. Brandon is Wally's son.

Matthews (1) 
Herbie Matthews
Herb Matthews Jr.
Herb Matthews Sr.
Norm Matthews
Herb, Sr. was Herbie's father and Herb, Jr. was his son. Norm was the second son of Herb Sr.

Matthews (2) 
Kelvin Matthews
Leigh Matthews
Kelvin and Leigh are brothers.

Matthews (3)
 Don Matthews
 Norm Matthews
Norm was the father of Don.

May 
Charlie May
Wally May
Charlie was the father of Wally.

Maynard
 Brayden Maynard
 Corey Maynard
 Peter Maynard
Peter is the father of Brayden and Corey.

McAdam 
Adrian McAdam
Gilbert McAdam
Greg McAdam
Adrian, Gilbert and Greg are brothers.

McAsey
 Alan McAsey
 Darren McAsey
Alan is the father of Darren.

McCabe
 Bill McCabe
 Bill McCabe Jr.
Bill was the father of Bill Jr.

McCarthy/Olle
 Bernie McCarthy
 Gavan McCarthy
 John McCarthy
 Matthew McCarthy
 Shane McCarthy
 Alan Olle
Shane is the father of John and Matthew. Bernie and Gavan are Shane's brothers. Alan was the grandfather of John and Matthew.

McCartin
 Paddy McCartin
 Tom McCartin
Paddy is the older brother of Tom.

McDonald (1) 
Alex McDonald
Anthony McDonald
James McDonald
Alex, Anthony and James are brothers

McDonald (2) 
 Edwin McDonald
 Arch McDonald
 Fen McDonald
Edwin, Arch, and Fen are brothers

McDonald (3) 
Oscar McDonald
Tom McDonald
Tom is the older brother of Oscar.

McFarlane 
 Alex McFarlane
 Bill McFarlane

Alex is the uncle of Bill.

McGhie 
Joe McGhie (Australian footballer)
Robbie McGhie
Joe and Robbie ("Bones") are brothers.

McGovern 
Andrew McGovern
Jeremy McGovern
Mitch McGovern
Andrew is the father of Jeremy and Mitch.

McGrath (1)
Ashley McGrath
Cory McGrath
Toby McGrath
Marty McGrath
Dion Woods
Ashley, Cory and Toby are brothers. Marty and Dion Woods are cousins of Ashley, Cory & Toby.

McGrath (2)
 Dennis McGrath
 Tim McGrath
Dennis is the father of Tim.

McGrath (3)
 Frank McGrath
 Shane McGrath
Frank and Shane were brothers.

McHale
 Jock McHale
 John McHale
Jock was the father of John.

McIntosh 
Ashley McIntosh
John McIntosh
John is the father of Ashley.

McKay
 Abbie McKay
 Andrew McKay
Abbie is Andrew's daughter.

McKenzie (1)
 Bob McKenzie
 Robert McKenzie
Bob is the father of Robert.

McKenzie (2)
 Jack McKenzie
 Jack McKenzie Jr.
Jack was the father of Jack Jr.

McKenzie (3) 
 Ken McKenzie
 Alec McKenzie
 Jack McKenzie

Ken, Alec and Jack were brothers.

McKernan 
Corey McKernan
Shaun McKernan
Corey is the elder brother of Shaun.

McLaughlin
 Hugh J. McLaughlin
 Hugh E. McLaughlin
Hugh J. was the father of Hugh E.

McLean 
Brock McLean
Ricky McLean
Rod McLean
Rod was the father of Ricky and Ricky is the uncle of Brock.

McLeish
 John McLeish
 Maurie McLeish
Maurie was the father of John.

McNamara
 Bill McNamara
 Pat McNamara
Bill was the father of Pat.

McPharlin
 Ray McPharlin
 Luke McPharlin
Ray was the grandfather of Luke.

McShane 
Henry McShane
Jim McShane
Joe McShane
Henry, Jim and Joe were brothers. Additionally, three other brothers were leading players in Victoria prior to the commencement of the VFL.

McVeigh 
Jarrad McVeigh
Mark McVeigh
Jarrad and Mark are brothers.

Mead
Darren Mead
Jackson Mead
Darren is Jackson's father.

Merrington
 Andrew Merrington
 Gary Merrington
Gary is the father of Andrew.

Merrett
Jackson Merrett
Zach Merrett
Jackson and Zach are brothers.

Merryweather/Guthrie
 Andrew Merryweather
 Cameron Guthrie
 Zach Guthrie

Andrew is the father of Cameron and Zach.

Metherell 
Jack Metherell
Len Metherell
Len was the elder brother of Jack.

Michael 
Clem Michael
Stephen Michael
Stephen is Clem's father.

Middlemiss
 Glen Middlemiss
 Russell Middlemiss
Russell is the father of Glen.

Miers
 David Miers (Subiaco, Claremont)
 Gryan Miers 
David is the father of Gryan.

Mihocek 
 Brody Mihocek
 Jack Mihocek
Jack is the father of Brody.

Milburn
 Charlie Milburn
 Pat Milburn
Charlie was the father of Pat.

Miller
 Allan Miller
 Greg Miller
Alan is the father of Greg.

Mills
 Bert Mills
 Arthur Mills
Bert and Arthur were brothers

Mitchell
 Barry Mitchell
 Tom Mitchell
Barry is the father of Tom.

Mithen
 Kevin Mithen
 Laurie Mithen
Kevin and Laurie are brothers.

Molloy (1) 
Glenn Molloy
Graham Molloy
Glenn is the son of Graham.

Molloy (2) 
Jarrod Molloy
Shane Molloy
Chloe Molloy
Shane is the father of Jarrod.
Chloe Molloy is a niece of Jarrod Molloy

Moloney (1)
 Brian Moloney
 Troy Moloney
 Abbi Moloney
Brian is the father of Troy. Troy is the father of Abbi.

Moloney (2)
 George Moloney Jr.
 George Moloney Sr.
 Vin Moloney
George Sr. was the father of George Jr. and Vin.

Moncrieff
 Allan Moncrieff
 Michael Moncrieff
Allan is the father of Michael.

Monohan 
Jack Monohan Sr.
Jack Monohan Jr.
Jack senior was the father of Jack junior.

Montgomery
 Allan Montgomery
 Bill Montgomery
 Ken Montgomery
Bill was the brother of Allan and the father of Ken.

Mooney 
Cameron Mooney
Jason Mooney
Jason is Cameron's elder brother.

Moore (1)
 Herbert Moore
 Roy Moore
Herbert was the father of Roy.

Moore (2)
Andrew Moore
Kelvin Moore
Kelvin is the elder brother of Andrew

Moore (3)
Peter Moore
Son: Darcy Moore
Peter is the father of Darcy.

Morden
 Clem Morden
 Jim Morden
 Jack O'Rourke, Snr.
 Basil O'Rourke
 Jack O'Rourke
Clem and Jim were brother. Jack O'Rourke, Snr. was married to their sister, and Basil and Jack were their nephews.

Moriarty 
Dan Moriarty
Geoff Moriarty
Jack Moriarty
Geoff and Dan were brothers and Geoff was the father of Jack.

Morris
Kevin Morris
Steven Morris

Morrison
 Peter Morrison
 Shane Morrison
Peter is the father of Shane.

Morrissey
 George Morrissey
 George Morrissey Jr.
George Sr. was the father of George.

Mort
 Harry Mort
Ian Mort
Harry was the father of Ian.

Morton 
Noel Morton
Cale Morton
Jarryd Morton
Mitch Morton
Noel played in the WAFL for Claremont and is the father of Mitch, Cale and Jarryd.

Morwood 
Paul Morwood
Shane Morwood
Tony Morwood
All three are brothers

Motley 
Geof Motley
Peter Motley
Geof is the father of Peter

Motlop 
Daniel Motlop
Marlon Motlop
Shannon Motlop
Steven Motlop
Rod Waddell
Daniel, Steven and Shannon are brothers, Marlon is a cousin of Daniel, Steven and Shannon. Rod is an uncle of Daniel, Steven and Shannon.

Muller 
Angie Muller
Nick Muller
Angie and Nick were brothers.

Munday
 Jim Munday
 Jim Munday Sr.
Jim Sr. was the father of Jim.

Murdoch 
Brodie Murdoch
Jordan Murdoch
Brodie and Jordan are brothers

Murphy (1) 
Frank Murphy
Len Murphy
Frank and Len were brothers

Murphy (2) 
Leo Murphy
John Murphy
Marc Murphy
Leo was the father of John and grandfather of Marc.

Murphy (3) 
Jack Murphy
John P. Murphy
Jack was the father of John.

Murray 
Dan Murray
Kevin Murray
Dan was the father of Kevin.

N

Naismith
 Charlie Naismith
 Wally Naismith
 Alby Naismith
 Herb Naismith
Wally, twin brother of Charlie Naismith, was the father of Alby and Herb Naismth.

Nankervis (1)
Bruce Nankervis
Ian Nankervis
Bruce and Ian are brothers.

Nankervis (2)
 Stephen Nankervis
 Vic Nankervis
Stephen was the father of Vic.

Narkle 
Keith Narkle
Phil Narkle
Keith is the elder brother of Phil.

Nash 
Thomas Nash
 Michael Nash
Robert Nash
Laurie Nash
Robert Nash Jr.
Robert was the father of Laurie and Robert Jr. Michael was Robert's father and Thomas's brother.

Neagle 
Merv Neagle
Jay Neagle
Merv was the father of Jay.

Nelson 
Sandy Nelson
Ben Nelson
Sandy is the father of Ben.

Nicholls
Geoff Nicholls
Reg Nicholls
Geoff was the elder brother of Reg.

Nisbet
 Darryl Nisbet
 Des Nisbet
Des was the father of Darryl.

Niven
 Colin Niven
 Ray Niven
Colin and Ray were brothers.

Nolan
 Bernie Nolan
 Herb Nolan
 Jerry Nolan
 Tom Nolan
Bernard, Herb, Jerry and Tom were brothers.

O

Oaten
 Max Oaten
 Michael Oaten
Max is the father of Michael.

Oatey
 Jack Oatey
 Peter Oatey
 Robert Oatey
 David Oatey
Jack was the father of Peter and Robert. David is the son of Robert

Oborne
 Brad Oborne
 Rod Oborne
Rod is the father of Brad.

O'Brien (1)
 Dally O'Brien
 Jock O'Brien
Jock was the elder brother of Dally.

O'Brien (2)
 Craig O'Brien
 Ron O'Brien
Ron is the father of Craig.

Obst
 Ken Obst
 Peter Obst
 Andrew Obst
Trevor Obst
Brad Ebert

Ken was the father of Trevor and Peter and the grandfather of Andrew.
Brad Ebert is the grandson of Trevor Obst.

O'Connell
 David O'Connell
 John O'Connell
 Michael O'Connell
John is the father of David and Michael.

O'Donnell (1)
 Gary O'Donnell
 Graeme O'Donnell
Graeme is the father of Gary.

O'Donnell (2)
 Kevin O'Donnell
 Simon O'Donnell
Kevin is the father of Simon.

O'Driscoll
 Emma O'Driscoll
 Nathan O'Driscoll
Emma and Nathan are siblings.

Ogden
Gordon Ogden
Percy Ogden
 Terry Ogden
Percy was the father of Gordon and Terry.

O'Halloran
 Eddie O'Halloran
 Kevin O'Halloran
Kevin was the father of Eddie.

O'Hara
 Frank O'Hara
 Jack O'Hara
 Jim O'Hara
Frank, Jack and Jim were brothers.

O'Loughlin
Michael O'Loughlin
Ricky O'Loughlin
Michael and Ricky are brothers.

Oppy
 Grant Oppy
 Max Oppy
Max was the father of Grant.

O'Rourke
 Jack O'Rourke, Snr.
 Clem Morden
 Jim Morden
 Basil O'Rourke
 Jack O'Rourke
Jack O'Rourke, Snr. was the brother-in-law of Clem and Jim Morden, and the father of Basil and Jack (who were, also, the nephews of Clem and Jim Morden).

Osborne
 Graham Osborne
 Richard Osborne
Richard is the elder brother of Graham.

O'Sullivan
 Gabby O'Sullivan
 John O'Sullivan (East Fremantle and Central District)
John is Gabby's father.

Ottens
 Brad Ottens
 Dean Ottens
 Luke Ottens
Dean is the father of Brad and Luke.

Outen
 Alby Outen
 Alby Outen Jr.
 Matt Outen
 Wyn Outen
Alby, Matt, and Wyn were brothers; and Alby was the father of Alby Jr.

P

Pagan
 Denis Pagan
 Ryan Pagan
Denis is the father of Ryan.

Pannam 
Albert Pannam
Alby Pannam
Charlie E. Pannam
Charlie H. Pannam
Charlie H. Pannam and Albert Pannam were brothers. Charlie was also the father of Alby and Charlie E.

Papley/Ross
 Max Papley
 Tom Papley
 Ben Ross
 Michael Ross

Max Papley is the grandfather of Tom Papley and also grandfather to brothers Ben and Michael Ross.

Parker 
Daniel Parker
Shane Parker
Shane and Daniel are brothers.

Pascoe 
Barry Pascoe
Bob Pascoe
Bob is the elder brother of Barry

Paternoster 
Jim Paternoster
Matt Paternoster
Jim and Matt were brothers

Pattinson
 Artie Pattinson
 George Pattinson
Artie was the father of George.

Pattison
 Andy Pattison
 Frank Pattison
Andy was the father of Frank.

Pavlich
 Matthew Pavlich
 Steven Pavlich
Steven is the father of Matthew.

Peake 
Brett Peake
Brian Peake
Brian is the father of Brett.

Pender
 Dan Pender
 Jim Pender
 Laurie Pender
 Mick Pender
Dan, Jim, Laurie and Mick were brothers .

Pert 
Brian Pert
Gary Pert
Brian is the father of Gary.

Phillipou
 Peter Phillipou
 Sam Phillipou
Peter is the father of Sam.

Phillips (1) 
 Garry Phillips
 Ken Phillips
Ken is the father of Garry.

Phillips (2) 
 Greg Phillips
 Erin Phillips
Erin is Greg's daughter.

Shaun Burgoyne is the son-in-law of Greg and brother-in-law of Erin

Phillips (3) 
 Ed Phillips
 Tom Phillips
Tom is the older brother of Ed.

Picken 
Billy Picken
Liam Picken
 Marcus Picken
Billy is the father of Liam and Marcus.

Pickering
 Liam Pickering
 Michael Pickering
Michael was the father of Liam.

Pirrie
 Dick Pirrie
 Richard Pirrie
 Kevin Pirrie
 Stephen Pirrie
Richard was the father of Dick and Kevin and the grandfather of Stephen.

Pitura
 John Pitura
 Mark Pitura
John is the father of Mark.

Polak 
Graham Polak
Troy Polak
Troy is the elder brother of Graham

Poulter 
Joe Poulter
Ray Poulter
Joe was the father of Ray.

Powell 
Matthew Powell (Australian footballer)
Tom Powell (footballer)
Matthew is the father of Tom.

Power 
Luke Power
Sam Power
Luke is the elder brother of Sam.

Pratt
 Bob Pratt
 Bob Pratt Jr.
Bob was the father of Bob Jr.

Prescott
 Ashley Prescott
 David Prescott
David is the father of Ashley.

Price
 Joe Price
 Noel Price
Joe was the father of Noel.

Prior
Jaxon Prior
Michael Prior
Michael is the father of Jaxon.

Purdy
 Harry Purdy
 Harry F. Purdy
Harry was the father of Harry F.

Pyke
 Don Pyke
 Frank Pyke
 James Pyke
Don and James are the sons of former WAFL player Frank

Q

Quinn (1)
 Bob Quinn Port Adelaide
 George Quinn Port Adelaide
 Jack Quinn Jnr Port Adelaide
 John Quinn Sr. Port Adelaide
 Tommy Quinn Geelong and Port Adelaide
 John Sidoli Port Adelaide

John Sr. was the father of Bob, Tommy, Jack and George. John Sidoli was John Sr's uncle and Bob, George, Jack and Tommy's great-uncle.

Quinn (2)
 Billy Quinn
 Roy Quinn
Billy was the father of Roy.

R

Raines 
Andrew Raines
Geoff Raines
Geoff is Andrew's father.

Ralphsmith
Hugo Ralphsmith
Sean Ralphsmith

Sean is Hugo's father.

Ramshaw
Darrin Ramshaw
Graham Ramshaw

Graham was Darrin's father.

Rance 
Alex Rance
Murray Rance
Murray is the father of Alex.

Randall
 Pepa Randall
 Trevor Randall
 Viv Randall
Viv was the father of Trevor, Trevor is the grandfather of Pepa.

Rankin 

Bert Rankin
Cliff Rankin
Doug Rankin
Georgie Rankin
Teddy Rankin
Tom Rankin
Teddy was the brother of Tom and father of Bert, Cliff and Doug, and the great-great-grandfather of Georgie. Cliff is the grandfather of Graeme O'Donnell and great-grandfather of Gary O'Donnell.

Rawle 
George Rawle
Keith Rawle
George was the father of Keith.

Rawlings 
Brady Rawlings
Jade Rawlings
Brady and Jade are brothers.

Rayson 
Alan Rayson
Arthur Rayson
Noel Rayson
Arthur was the father of Alan and Noel.

Reedman
 Jack Reedman
 Sid Reedman
Jack and Sid were brothers.

Reeves/Caddy
 John Reeves
 Michael Reeves
 Josh Caddy
Ned Reeves
John was the father of Michael. Josh Caddy is John's grandson, as is Ned.

Reid
 Ben Reid
 Bruce Reid Jr.
 Bruce Reid Sr.
 John Reid
 Sam Reid
Bruce Sr. was the father of Bruce and John. Bruce Jr. is the father of Ben and Sam

Reiffel
 Lou Reiffel
 Ron Reiffel
Lou was the father of Ron.

Reilly 
Jack 'Corp' Reilly- 204 games for South Fremantle, captain and B&F winner, 11 state games for Western Australia
Jim Reilly Played at Norwood during the 2nd world war
Graeme Reilly - 132 games for South Fremantle, Captain, 1 premiership, 1 interstate game
John Reilly Carlton, Footscray and South Fremantle
Jack and Jim are brothers. Graeme and John are sons of Jack.

Rendell
Matthew Rendell West Torrens, Fitzroy and Brisbane
Tim Rendell West Torrens, Fitzroy and Caulfield
Matthew and Tim are brothers.

Reynolds 
Dick Reynolds
Joel Reynolds
Les Reynolds
Tom Reynolds
Dick and Tom were brothers and Joel is Dick's grandson. Les was the uncle of Dick. The Reynolds brothers had a cousin Max Oppy who also played league football.

Richards 
Lou Richards
Ron Richards
Ed Richards
Lou is the elder brother of Ron. Ed is Ron's grandson. Charlie Pannam was their grandfather.

Richardson (1) 
Alan Richardson
Rodger Richardson
Matthew Richardson
Alan and Rodger were brothers.
Alan is the father of Matthew.

Richardson (2) 
Mark Richardson
Max Richardson
Wayne Richardson
Max and Wayne are brothers. Mark is Wayne's son.

Richardson (3) 
Mike Richardson
Stephen Richardson
Mike and Stephen are twin brothers.

Rioli 

Cyril Rioli
Daniel Rioli
Dean Rioli
Maurice Rioli
Maurice Rioli Jr
Willie Rioli
Maurice is Maurice Jr's father, Dean, Cyril and Willie's uncle, and Daniel's great uncle. Dean's father Sebastian, Cyril's father Cyril and Willie's father Willie Snr (all Maurice's brothers) played in the West Australian Football League for South Fremantle.  Cyril Rioli is also Michael Long's nephew.

Rippon
 Les Rippon
 Harold Rippon
 Norm Rippon
Les, Harold and Norm were brothers.

Roach 
Michael Roach
Tom Roach
Michael is the father of Tom.

Robbins
 Ben Robbins
 Graham Robbins
Graham is the father of Ben.

Roberts (1)
Michael Roberts
Neil Roberts
Neil is the father of Michael.

Roberts (2)
 Ken E. Roberts
 Ken W. Roberts
Ken E. Roberts was the father of Ken W. Roberts.

Robertson (1)
Austin Robertson Jr.
Austin Robertson Sr.
Harold Robertson
Austin Robertson junior is the son of Austin and the nephew of Harold.

Robertson (2)
Keith Robertson
Rohan Robertson
Shane Robertson
Keith is the father of Rohan and Shane.

Robinson
Alex Robinson
Bill Robinson
Fred Robinson
Gordon Robinson
All four were brothers.

Robran 
Barrie Robran
Matthew Robran
Jonathon Robran
Rodney Robran

Barrie is the elder brother to Rodney and the father of Matthew and Jonathan.

Rocca 
Anthony Rocca
Saverio Rocca
Anthony and Saverio are brothers.

Rodan 
David Rodan
Helen Roden
Helen is David's sister.

Rogers
 Dave Rogers
 Joe Rogers
Joe was the father of David.

Rollason
 Ken Rollason
 Neville Rollason
Neville was the father of Ken.

Rose 
Bill Rose
Bob Rose
Kevin Rose
Ralph Rose
Robert Rose
Bob was the father of Robert junior. He was also the elder brother of Bill, Kevin and Ralph.

Ross (1)
 Don Ross
 Paul Ross
Don is the father of Paul.

Ross (2)
 Jonathan Ross
 Lester Ross
Lester is the father of Jonathan.

Round
 Barry Round
 David Round
Barry is the father of David.

Rowe (1) 
Des Rowe
Percy Rowe
Percy was the father of Des.

Rowe (2) 
James Rowe
Stephen Rowe
Stephen is the father of James.

Rugolo
 Frank Rugolo
 Joe Rugolo
Frank and Joe are brothers.

Ruscuklic 
Alex Ruscuklic
Peter Ruscuklic
Alex is the elder brother of Peter.

Rush 
 Bob Rush
 Bryan Rush
 Gerald Rush
 Kevin Rush
 Leo Rush
The Rush's are all brothers; the only case of five brothers playing senior VFL/AFL football.

Russell (1)
 Ivan Russell
 Wally Russell
Wally was the father of Ivan.

Russell (2)
 Kym Russell
 Scott Russell
Kym is the elder brother of Scott

Russo
 Felix Russo
 Peter Russo
Felix is the father of Peter. Felix is also the grandfather of three players, Josh Kennedy, Luke Ball and Matthew Ball; as two of his daughters married footballers John Kennedy Jr. and Ray Ball.

Ryan
 Phil Ryan
 Ted Ryan
Phil was the elder brother of Ted.

Ryder
 Revis Ryder
 Paddy Ryder
Revis is the father of Paddy.

S

Sandford
 Ben Sandford
 Cecil Sandford
 George Sandford
The three were brothers.

Sawley
 Albert Sawley
 Gordon Sawley
Gordon was the elder brother of Albert.

Scanlan
 Joe Scanlan
 Pat Scanlan
 Kevin Scanlan
Joe and Pat were brothers and Pat was the father of Kevin.

Scarlett 
John Scarlett
Matthew Scarlett
John is the father of Matthew.

Schache
Laurence Schache
Josh Schache
Laurence was the father of Josh.

Schimmelbusch 
Daryl Schimmelbusch
Wayne Schimmelbusch
Daryl and Wayne are brothers.

Schwarze 
Ben Schwarze
Troy Schwarze
Troy is the elder brother of Ben.

Scott 
Brad Scott
Chris Scott
Bradley and Chris are identical twins.

Searl
 Doug Searl
 Sid Searl
Sid was the father of Doug.

Selleck
 Roy Selleck Sr.
 Roy Selleck
Roy Sr. was the father of Roy.

Selwood 
Adam Selwood
Joel Selwood
Scott Selwood
Troy Selwood
All four are brothers (Adam and Troy are twins).

Serafini 
Laurie Serafini
Renato Serafini
Renato is the elder brother of Laurie.

Sexton (1)
Ben Sexton
Michael Sexton
Michael is the elder brother of Ben.

Sexton (2)
 Damian Sexton
 Gerry Sexton
Gerry was the father of Damian.

Sharp
 Alf Sharp
 Mickey Sharp
Alf was the father of Mickey.

Shaw 
Brayden Shaw
Heath Shaw
Neville Shaw
Ray Shaw
 Reg Shaw
Rhyce Shaw
Robert Shaw
Tony Shaw
 Kelvin Shaw
Reg was the father of Kelvin, Ray, Tony and Neville. Ray is the father of Heath and Rhyce. Brayden, the son of Tony, was drafted by Collingwood but never made his AFL debut. Robert is the cousin of Kelvin, Ray, Tony and Neville (his father is the brother of Reg).

Shea 
Mark Shea
Paddy Shea
Mark was the elder brother of Paddy.

Sheahan (1)
 John Sheahan
 Maurie Sheahan
Maurie was the father of John.

Sheahan (2)
 Fred Sheahan
 Gerald Sheahan
Fred and Gerald were brothers.

Sheldon 
Ken Sheldon
Sam Sheldon
Ken is the father of Sam.

Shelton (1)
 Ian Shelton
 Bill Shelton
 Jack Shelton
Jack was the father of Bill and the uncle of Ian. Ian and Bill are cousins.

Shelton (2)
 Jim Shelton
 John Shelton
Jim was the father of John.

Shephard
 Graeme Shephard
 Heath Shephard
Graeme is the father of Heath.

Sholl 
Brad Sholl
Brett Sholl
Craig Sholl
Lachlan Sholl
Craig and Brad are brothers. Brett is the first cousin of Craig and Brad. Lachlan is Brett's son.

Sidebottom 
Allan Sidebottom
Garry Sidebottom
Beau McDonald
Garry is the elder brother of Allan, and the uncle of Beau McDonald.

Sierakowski 
Brian Sierakowski
David Sierakowski
Will Sierakowski
Brian is the father of David and uncle of Will.

Silvagni 
Sergio Silvagni
Stephen Silvagni
Alex Silvagni
Jack Silvagni
Ben Silvagni
Sergio is the father of Stephen. Alex is Stephen's first cousin once removed. Jack is the son of Stephen and the grandson of Sergio.

Simpkin 
 Jonathan Simpkin
 Tom Simpkin
Jonathan is Tom's older brother.

Sinclair 
Allan Sinclair
Callum Sinclair
Allan is Callum's father.

Slattery 
Tyson Slattery
Wayne Slattery
Wayne is the father of Tyson.

Smith (1) 
Len Smith
Norm Smith
Peter Smith
Norm was the younger brother of Len and the father of Peter.

Smith (2)
 Michael Smith
 Stan Smith
Stan is the father of Michael.

Smith (3) 
Jesse W. Smith
Ross W. Smith
Jesse is the son of Ross.

Smith (4) 
Brad Smith
Phil Smith
Phil is the father of Brad.

Smith (5) 
Mal Smith
Nick Smith
Mal is the father of Nick.

Somerville 
Trevor Somerville
John Somerville
Peter Somerville
John and Trevor were brothers, and John was Peter's father.

Spargo 
Bob Spargo Sr
Bob Spargo jnr
Paul Spargo
Charlie Spargo
Ricky Spargo
Bob sr is the father of Bob Jr and Ricky.
Bob Jr is the father of Paul.
Paul is the father of Charlie

Stephenson
 Jack Stephenson
 John F. Stephenson
Jack was the father of John.

Stevens (1)
Gary Stevens
Anthony Stevens
Michael Stevens
Gary is Anthony's elder brother, Michael is the younger brother

Stevens (2)
 Danny Stevens
 Nick Stevens
Danny is the elder brother of Nick

Stevens/Talia
 Arthur Stevens
 Harvey Stevens
 Grandson: Daniel Talia
 Grandson: Michael Talia
Arthur was the father of Harvey, Harvey is the grandfather of brothers Daniel and Michael.

Stibbard
 Neville Stibbard Sr.
 Neville Stibbard
 Robert Stibbard
Neville Sr. is the father of Neville and Robert.

Stokes 
Jervis Stokes
Ray Stokes
Ray is the elder brother of Jervis

Strang 

Bill Strang
 Grandson: John Perry
Allan Strang
Colin Strang
Doug Strang
Geoff Strang
Gordon Strang
Bill was the father of Allan, Colin, Doug, Gordon, and Edna "Bob" Perry née Strang. Doug is the father of Geoff; Edna is the mother of John Perry.

Strom
Mim Strom
Zach Strom (South Fremantle)
Noah Strom (South Fremantle)
Mim, Zach and Noah are siblings.

Stynes 
Brian Stynes
Jim Stynes
Brian is the younger brother of Jim.

Sullivan
 Tony Sullivan
 Chris Sullivan
Tony is the father of Chris.

Sumner
 Byron Sumner
 Tim Sumner
Byron and Tim are brothers.

Swallow 
Andrew Swallow
David Swallow
Andrew is the elder brother of David.

Swan
 Bill Swan
 Dane Swan
Bill is Dane's father.

T

Talia 
See Stevens/Talia

Tanner
 Gerald Tanner
 Xavier Tanner
Gerald is the father of Xavier.

Tarrant
 Chris Tarrant
 Robbie Tarrant
Chris is the elder brother of Robbie.

Taylor (1)
 John Taylor Snr.
Don Taylor
 John Taylor Jnr.
Laurie Taylor
John Taylor Snr. was the father of Don, John Jnr. and Laurie.

Taylor (2)
 Cliff "Beau" Taylor
 Jason Taylor
 Noel Taylor
Cliff was the father of Noel and the grandfather of Jason.

Thiessen
 Tony Thiessen
 James Thiessen
Tony is the father of James.

Thomas (1)
William Thomas
Len Thomas
William was the father of Len.

Thomas (2) 
William 'Digger' Thomas
Ritchie Thomas
Digger Thomas was the father of Ritchie.

Thripp 
Bill Thripp
Terry Thripp
Bill is the father of Terry.

Tippett 
Kurt Tippett
Joel Tippett
Kurt and Joel are brothers

Tohill
 Anthony Tohill
 Anton Tohill

Anthony is Anton's father.

Toohey (1)
 Jim Toohey Sr.
 Jack Toohey
 Jim Toohey Jr.
Jim Sr. was the father of Jack and Jim Jr.

Toohey (2)
 Bernard Toohey
 Gerard Toohey
Bernard and Gerard are brothers.

Tossol
 John Tossol
 Peter Tossol
John and Peter are brothers.

Tredrea 
Gary Tredrea 
Warren Tredrea
Gary is the father of Warren.

Tribe 
George Tribe Footscray
Tom Tribe Footscray
George and Tom were brothers.

Tuck 
Michael Tuck
Shane Tuck
Travis Tuck
Michael is the father of Shane and Travis. Nathan, Luke and Gary Ablett (Jr) are Travis and Shane's cousins.

Tuddenham
 Des Tuddenham
 Paul Tuddenham
Des is the father of Paul.

Turner (1) 
Leo Turner
Michael Turner
Leo is the father of Michael.

Turner (2) 
Ken Turner
Jamie Turner
Ken is the father of Jamie.

Twomey 
Bill Twomey Sr.
Bill Twomey Jr.
Mick Twomey
Pat Twomey
David Twomey
Bill Sr. was the father of Bill, Mick and Pat the grandfather of David.

Tyson
 Charles, Snr. Tyson
 Charlie Tyson
 Edward Tyson (Prahran)
 George Tyson
 Jack Tyson
 Sam Tyson ( player and coach)
 Ted Tyson
Charles Snr. was the father of Charlie, Edward, George, Jack and Sam. Ted was the son of Sam.

V

van Berlo 
Jay van Berlo
Nathan van Berlo
Jay and Nathan are brothers.

Vinar
Eric Vinar
Paul Vinar
Paul was the elder brother of Eric.

Viney 
Jay Viney
Todd Viney
Son: Jack Viney
Todd is the elder brother of Jay and the father of Jack.

Voss 
Brett Voss
Michael Voss
Brett and Michael are brothers.

W

Wagner
Corey Wagner
Josh Wagner

Josh and Corey are brothers.

Waite 
Vin Waite
Jarrad Waite
Vin was the father of Jarrad.

Wakelin 
Darryl Wakelin
Shane Wakelin
Darryl and Shane are identical twin brothers.

Walker
Daisy Walker
Will Walker
Daisy and Will are siblings.

Wallis (1)
Tom Wallis
Gary Wallis
Tom was the father of Gary.

Wallis (2) 
Stephen Wallis
Mitch Wallis
Stephen is the father of Mitch.

Wallis (3) 
Dean Wallis
Tom Wallis
Dean is the father of Tom.

Warburton
 Keith Warburton
 Peter Warburton
Keith was the father of Peter.

Ward
 Eric Ward
 Geoff Ward
Eric was the father of Geoff.

Ware
 Norman Ware
 Wally Ware
 Bob Ware
Wally was the brother of Norm and the father of Bob.

Warhurst
 Tom Warhurst Sr.
 Tom Warhurst Jr.
Tom Sr. was the father of Tom Jr

Warner 
Chad Warner
Travis Warner (South Fremantle)
Travis is Chad's father.

Warnock 
Matthew Warnock
Robert Warnock
Matthew is Robert's elder brother.

Waterman 
Chris Waterman
Jake Waterman
Chris is the father of Jake

Waters 
Bryan Waters
Terry Waters
Bryan is the elder brother of Terry

Watson 
Larry Watson
Tim Watson
Jobe Watson
Tim is the father of Jobe and the brother of Larry.

Way
 Jack Way
 Alec Way
Jack was the father of Alec.

Wearmouth
 Dick Wearmouth
 Ronnie Wearmouth
Dick was the father of Ronnie.

Weatherill 
George Weatherill
Robert Weatherill
Robert was the elder brother of George.

Weideman
 Murray Weideman
 Mark Weideman
 Sam Weideman
Murray is the father of Mark, who is the father of Sam.

Weller
 Maverick Weller
 Lachie Weller
Maverick is the older brother of Lachie.

Wells
 Tom Wells
 Tommy Wells
Tom was the father of Tommy.

Welsh (1)
 Bill Welsh
 Peter Welsh
Bill was the father of Peter.

Welsh (2)
 Jack Welsh
 Peter Welsh
Jack was the father of Peter.

Western 
Joel Western
Mikayla Western
Joel and Mikayla are siblings.

Westhoff 
Justin Westhoff
Leigh Westhoff (Central District)
Matthew Westhoff
 Nicholas Westhoff (Richmond rookie list, West Adelaide)
Leigh, Justin and Matthew are brothers. Nick is a cousin.

Wheelahan
 Danny Wheelahan
 Martin Wheelahan
Danny was Martin's older brother.

Wheeler
 Garry Wheeler
 Terry Wheeler
 Willie Wheeler (Williamstown)
Terry was Garry's older brother, Willie is their nephew.

Whelan
 Marcus Whelan
 Shane Whelan
Marcus was the father of Shane.

Whitnall 
Graeme Whitnall
Lance Whitnall
Graeme is Lance's father.

Whitten 
Don Whitten
Ted Whitten
Ted Whitten jnr
Ted was the father of Ted Jr. and elder brother of Don.

Wiggins 
Patrick Wiggins
Simon Wiggins
Patrick and Simon are brothers.

Williams (1)
Fos Williams
Anthony Williams
Mark Williams
Stephen Williams
Fos was the father of Anthony, Mark and Stephen. Anthony and Mark were twins. Additionally Fos' brothers Alec, Frank and Glynn all played senior SANFL football while another brother, Thomas, played in the WAFL.

Williams (2)
 Frank H. Williams
 Frank P. Williams
Frank H. was the father of Frank P.

Williams (3)
 Billy Williams
 Rod Williams
Billy was the father of Rod.

Williams (4)
 Les Williams
 Gary Williams
Les is the father of Gary.

Williams (5)
 John Williams
 Mark Williams
John is the father of Mark.

Williams (6)
 Richard Williams
 Lyall Williams
Richard and Lyall were brothers.

Wilson (1)
 Arnie Wilson
 Ron Wilson
Arnie was the father of Ron.

Wilson (2)
 Alf Wilson
 Percy Wilson
Alf and Percy were brothers.

Woodfield
 Les Woodfield
 Clarrie Woodfield
Les was the elder brother of Clarrie.

Woolnough
 Michael Woolnough
 Marc Woolnough
Michael is the father of Marc.

Worland 
Don Worland
John Worland
Don is the elder brother of John.

Worle 
 Len Worle
 Tommy Worle
Tommy is the older brother of Len.

Worsfold 
John Worsfold
Peter Worsfold
John is the elder brother of Peter.

Wright 
John Wright
Michael Wright
Stephen Wright
Michael is the elder brother of Stephen, their father John played for Box Hill in the VFA.

Wynd 
 Garrey Wynd
 Paul Wynd
 Scott Wynd
Garrey is the father of Paul and Scott.

Y

Yates
Percy Yates
Stan Yates
Percy was the elder brother of Stan.

Yeates 
John Yeates
Mark Yeates
John is the father of Mark.

Young 
Garry Young
Maurie Young
Maurie was the elder brother of Garry.

Youren 
George Youren (Collingwood, Northcote)
Colin Youren (Hawthorn)
George was the father of Colin.

Z

Zantuck 
Shane Zantuck
Ty Zantuck
Shane is the father of Ty.

References

Sources
 Atkinson, G. (1982) Everything you ever wanted to know about Australian rules football but couldn't be bothered asking, The Five Mile Press: Melbourne. .
 Blair, L. (2005) Immortals, John Wiley & Sons Australia: Milton, Qld. .
 Hillier, K. (2004) Like Father Like Son, Pennon Publishing: Melbourne. .
 Piesse, K. (2010) The Bears Uncensored, Cricketbooks.com.au: Melbourne. .

External links 
Listing of players

Lists of players of Australian rules football
History of Australian rules football
 
Australian rules football culture
Australian rules football